CJOC-FM (94.1 FM) is a radio station in Lethbridge, Alberta. Owned by Vista Radio, it broadcasts a classic hits format.

History
The station was licensed by the Canadian Radio-television and Telecommunications Commission on August 2, 2006, and officially launched on July 3, 2007. The CJOC calls were previously used by an AM station in Lethbridge, which now broadcasts as CJRX-FM. That station has no ownership association with the current CJOC. Its sister station was CJCY-FM Medicine Hat.

In December 2018, Clear Sky Radio announced the sale of its remaining stations to Vista Radio. In June 2019, CJOC was rebranded under Vista's standard Juice FM brand.

In July 2020, CJOC reverted to its previous branding of 94.1 CJOC.

References

External links 

Joc
Joc
Radio stations established in 2007
2007 establishments in Alberta
JOC